The 2020 Qatar Cup, more widely known as the Crown Prince Cup, was the twenty-fifth edition of the Qatar Cup, and the first edition since 2018, as the competition did not take place in 2019. It was played from January 10–17. The cup is contested by the top four finishers of the 2018–19 Qatar Stars League.

Participants

Matches

Semi-finals

Finals

Bracket

Top scorers

References

Qatar Crown Prince Cup
Qatar Cup
Qatar Cup